Mount Dido is a prominent peak,  high, between Mount Electra and Mount Boreas in the Olympus Range of Victoria Land, Antarctica. It was named by the Victoria University of Wellington Antarctic Expedition of 1958–59 for Queen Dido, a figure in Greek mythology.

References 

Mountains of Victoria Land
McMurdo Dry Valleys